Cyprus Volleyball Division 1 is the top level volleyball league in Cyprus. The league is organised by the Cyprus Volleyball Federation since 1978. The league is contested by 9 teams.

History 
The Cyprus Volleyball Federation organises the league since 1978.

Pancyprio protathlima
 1928: G.S. Zinon 	 
 1929: G.S. Evagoras	  	 
 1931: G.S. Ta Pagcypria	  	 
 1932: A.M.O. Larnaca  	 
 1933: G.S. Zinon 	  	 
 1934: A.E. Limasol	  	 
 1936: G.S. Zinon 	 
 1938: G.S. Zinon 	 
 1939: G.S. Olympia	  	 
 1940: G.S. Zinon 	  	 
 1945: G.S. Zinon 	  	 
 1947: E.S. Alumni Greeks Cyprus	
 1949: G.S. Olympia 
 1954: APOEL  	 
 1958: Marathon Kato Barosion

Organized by SEGAS Cyprus
 1960: Marathon Kato Barosion	
 1962: Marathon Kato Barosion	 
 1963: PAEEK

Organized by Cypriot Local Committee for Sports
 1969: APOEL
 1970: APOEL	 
 1971: APOEL
 1972: APOEL

Organized by Greek Volleyball Federation Cyprus
 1973: Anorthosis  	   	
 1974: Olympiakos Nicosia
 1975: Anorthosis
 1976: Olympiakos Nicosia
 1977: Anorthosis

Organised by Cyprus Volleyball Federation
 1978: Anorthosis
 1979: APOEL
 1980: APOEL
 1981: APOEL
 1982: Anorthosis
 1983: APOEL
 1984: APOEL
 1985: APOEL
 1986: Anorthosis
 1987: Anorthosis
 1988: Anorthosis
 1989: Anorthosis
 1990: Nea Salamis
 1991: Nea Salamis
 1992: Pafiakos
 1993: Anorthosis
 1994: Anorthosis
 1995: Anorthosis
 1996: Anorthosis
 1997: Anorthosis
 1998: Nea Salamis
 1999: Nea Salamis
 2000: Nea Salamis
 2001: Nea Salamis
 2002: Nea Salamis
 2003: Nea Salamis
 2004: Pafiakos
 2005: Anorthosis
 2006: Pafiakos
 2007: Anorthosis
 2008: Anorthosis
 2009: Anorthosis
 2010: Anorthosis
 2011: Anorthosis
 2012: AEK Karava
 2013: Nea Salamis
 2014: Anorthosis
 2015: Omonia
 2016: Omonia
 2017: Omonia
 2018: Pafiakos
 2019: Omonia
 2020: Cancelled due to the COVID-19 pandemic
 2021: Omonia
 2022: Omonia
 2023: Omonia

Performance by club

External links
Cyprus Volleyball Federation 
Cyprus Volleyball Federation

References

Cyprus
Division 1
Volleyball competitions in Cyprus